Sarnaghbyur or Aghbulag is a village de facto in the Askeran Province of the breakaway Republic of Artsakh, de jure in the Khojaly District of Azerbaijan, in the disputed region of Nagorno-Karabakh. The village has an ethnic Armenian-majority population, and also had an Armenian majority in 1989.

History 
During the Soviet period, the village was part of the Askeran District of the Nagorno-Karabakh Autonomous Oblast.

Historical heritage sites 
Historical heritage sites in and around the village include an 18th/19th-century cemetery, the cave-shrine of Htsut, and St. George's Church built in 1875.

Economy and culture 
The population is mainly engaged in agriculture and animal husbandry. As of 2015, the village has a municipal building, a secondary school, and a medical centre. The community of Sarnaghbyur includes the village of Dahraz.

Demographics 
The village had 97 inhabitants in 2005, and 107 inhabitants in 2015.

Gallery

References

External links 
 

Sarn
Sarn